Frank John Mrvan (born April 16, 1969) is an American mortgage broker and politician who has served as the U.S. representative for  since 2021. From 2005 until 2021, he served as the township trustee for North Township, Indiana. Mrvan is a member of the Democratic Party.

Early life and career
Mrvan was born and raised in Hammond, Indiana. After graduating from Oliver P. Morton High School, he earned a bachelor's degree in journalism from Ball State University.

Mrvan worked as a licensed mortgage broker and pharmaceutical sales representative. In November 2005, he was appointed as the township trustee for North Township, Indiana, when his predecessor resigned.

U.S. House of Representatives

Elections

2020 

He was endorsed by Visclosky and the local chapter of the United Steelworkers. Mrvan won the Democratic nomination with 33% of the vote in a field of 14 candidates, including Thomas McDermott Jr. and Mara Candelaria Reardon. He defeated Republican Mark Leyva in the November general election, with 57% of the vote.

2022 

Mrvan ran for reelection against Republican nominee Jennifer-Ruth Green. Mrvan defeated Green with 53% of the vote.

Tenure 
Mrvan took office on January 3, 2021. He voted in favor of the second impeachment of Donald Trump, the American Rescue Plan Act of 2021, and the Protecting the Right to Organize Act, which he co-sponsored.

As of August 2022, Mrvan had voted in line with Joe Biden's stated position 100% of the time.

Mrvan obtained the House Appropriations Committee's approval of $22 million in budget year 2023 earmarks for infrastructure and economic development projects in Indiana.

COVID-19 policy
On January 31, 2023, Mrvan voted against H.R.497:Freedom for Health Care Workers Act, a bill which would lift COVID-19 vaccine mandates for healthcare workers.

On February 1, 2023, Mrvan voted against a resolution to end COVID-19 national emergency.

Syria
In 2023, Mrvan voted against H.Con.Res. 21 which directed President Joe Biden to remove U.S. troops from Syria within 180 days.

Voting rights
On February 9, 2023, Mrvan voted against H.J.Res. 24: Disapproving the action of the District of Columbia Council in approving the Local Resident Voting Rights Amendment Act of 2022 which condemns the District of Columbia’s plan that would allow noncitizens to vote in local elections.

Caucuses
Congressional Steel Caucus (co-chair)

Personal life 
Mrvan and his wife Jane (née Trimble) have two children.

His father, Frank E. Mrvan, is also a politician, serving in the Indiana Senate until January 2022.

References

External links

Representative Frank Mrvan official U.S. House website
 Campaign website

|-

1969 births
American politicians of Polish descent
Ball State University alumni
Democratic Party members of the United States House of Representatives from Indiana
Living people
People from Hammond, Indiana
American financial businesspeople
20th-century American businesspeople
21st-century American businesspeople
Businesspeople in the pharmaceutical industry
Local government officers
21st-century American politicians